"Goodnight Girl" is the third single from Scottish band Wet Wet Wet's fourth studio album, High on the Happy Side (1992). It was released on 23 December 1991 and was the second of the band's three UK number-one singles (the first being a cover of the Beatles' "With a Little Help from My Friends"), but the only one to be self-penned. Writer Graeme Clark was inspired to write the song for his then girlfriend, but has never publicly named her.

A string-laden ballad, "Goodnight Girl" spent four weeks at number one in the UK Singles Chart in January 1992. It also gave Wet Wet Wet their third Irish number-one single (after "With a Little Help from My Friends" and "Sweet Surrender") and reached the top 10 in Belgium and the Netherlands. Marti Pellow recorded his own version of the song for inclusion on his 2002 album Marti Pellow Sings the Hits of Wet Wet Wet & Smile.

Track listings

Original release

 UK CD1
 "Goodnight Girl"
 "With a Little Help from My Friends"
 "Sweet Surrender"
 "Goodnight Girl" (No Strings Attached version)

 UK CD2
 "Goodnight Girl"
 "Wishing I Was Lucky"
 "Temptation" (The Memphis Sessions version)
 "Angel Eyes (Home and Away)"

 UK cassette single
 "Goodnight Girl"
 "Ambrose Wykes"

 UK 7-inch single
A1. "Goodnight Girl"
B1. "Ambrose Wykes"
B2. "Put the Light On" (acoustic version) 

 Dutch 12-inch vinyl
A1. "Goodnight Girl"
B1. "Temptation" (The Memphis Sessions version)
B2. "With a Little Help from My Friends"

"Goodnight Girl '94"

 European CD and Japanese mini-CD single
 "Goodnight Girl '94"
 "Love Is All Around" (MTV Most Wanted version)

 European limited-edition two-CD single

CD1
 "Goodnight Girl '94"
 "Love Is All Around" (MTV Most Wanted version)
 "Goodnight Girl"

CD2
 "Shed a Tear"
 "Put the Light On"
 "Wishing I Was Lucky" (Arthur Baker '93 7-inch remix)

 Australian CD and cassette single
 "Goodnight Girl '94"
 "Love Is All Around" (MTV Most Wanted version)
 "Goodnight Girl" (original version)

 US CD and cassette single
 "Goodnight Girl" (remix) – 3:39
 "Love Is All Around" (MTV Most Wanted version) – 4:22

Charts

"Goodnight Girl"

Weekly charts

Year-end charts

"Goodnight Girl '94"

References

External links
 Officialcharts.com

1990s ballads
1991 singles
1991 songs
Irish Singles Chart number-one singles
Pop ballads
Songs written by Graeme Clark (musician)
Songs written by Marti Pellow
Songs written by Neil Mitchell (musician)
Songs written by Tommy Cunningham
UK Singles Chart number-one singles
Wet Wet Wet songs